Minnesota Sinfonia is a professional non-profit orchestra in Minnesota. The Sinfonia plays concerts for over 25,000 people each year. Founded in 1989 by Artistic Director Jay Fishman, the Minnesota Sinfonia is an independent, non-profit 501(c)(3) organization supported by corporate, foundation and individual contributors.

Programs

Music in the Schools
Music in the Schools (MIS) is the Sinfonia's inner-city education program. The orchestra develops a three-month curriculum with local teachers, focusing on a different core subject each year. Music in the Schools is designed specifically for public elementary students of Minneapolis and St. Paul with limited in-school arts opportunities, and the orchestra works with up to 12,000 elementary school students.

The culmination of each Music in the Schools program is "Sinfonia Day", a visit from the entire Minnesota Sinfonia to each participating school.

Young Artist Competition
The Young Artist Competition is an annual competition for musicians up to age 19. The competition is held every spring for residents of Minnesota, North Dakota, South Dakota, Iowa and Wisconsin. Both the junior and senior division winners are awarded solo appearances with the Sinfonia, and the senior division winner also receives the Claire Givens Violins $500 cash prize. The competition is held at the University of St. Thomas campus in St. Paul.

Youth Outreach Week
During Youth Outreach Week, 25 young musicians experience a "week in the life" of a professional musician. Students participate in a week of intensive orchestra rehearsals, culminating in a joint concert with the Minnesota Sinfonia.

Junior Composers Competition
Junior Composers and alumni up to age 19, compose celebratory, high-spirited works that will be part of the Sinfonia's Young Artists Week, culminating in a performance of the winning entry at the orchestra's Summer Concert Series.

History
In 1989, conductor Jay Fishman created the Minnesota Sinfonia, a professional chamber orchestra to serve families, children, inner-city youth, seniors, and those with limited incomes in Minnesota. Early on, the Sinfonia developed policies of free admission and children welcome to all performances.

Jay Fishman has been the artistic and executive director of the Minnesota Sinfonia since its inception in 1989. Fishman created Music in the Schools, the orchestra's education program for inner-city elementary students. To date, he has conducted over 1,300 performances, and introduced classical music to 150,000 inner-city elementary students.

Each year, the Sinfonia performs more free, in-school concerts than any professional orchestra in the state, allocating over 30 percent of its budget and half its concerts to educational programs.

References

External links
 Minnesota Sinfonia official website

Orchestras based in Minnesota
Culture of Minneapolis
Arts organizations based in Minneapolis
Musical groups established in 1989
1989 establishments in Minnesota